Hong Soon-young (30 January 1937 – 30 April 2014) was a South Korean diplomat. He has served in several high-level posts, including as presidential aide for state affairs, Foreign Minister, and Minister of Unification, and has been ambassador to Russia (1992–1993), Germany (1994–1998), The People's Republic of China (2000–2001), Malaysia (1990–1992), and Pakistan (1984–1987). He is a graduate of Seoul National University and attended the Graduate School of International Relations at Columbia University.

References

External links
Hong, Soon-young. "Thawing Korea's Cold War: The Path to Peace on the Korean Peninsula", Foreign Affairs, May/June 1999.
Interview with Asiaweek.com, December 17, 1999.
Text of a speech given to the Asia Society, September 23, 1998.

South Korean diplomats
1937 births
2014 deaths
Seoul National University School of Law alumni
School of International and Public Affairs, Columbia University alumni
Ambassadors of South Korea to Russia
Ambassadors of South Korea to China
Ambassadors of South Korea to Germany
Ambassadors of South Korea to Malaysia
Ambassadors of South Korea to Pakistan
Foreign ministers of South Korea